Protospongiidae is a fossil family of sponges belonging to the order Reticulosa.

Genera

Genera:
 Brooksella Bassler, 1941
 Diagoniella Rauff, 1894
 Gabelia Rigby & Murphy, 1983
 Stephanella Hinde, 1891

References

Sponges